The Penn State Nittany Lions wrestling program is an NCAA Division I Wrestling team competing as members of the Big Ten Conference.

The team is coached by Olympic Champion Cael Sanderson (Athens 2004) and have maintained status as one of the top collegiate wrestling programs in the country, with a four-year NCAA Team Championship streak from 2011-2014, and an additional four-year NCAA Team Championship streak from 2016-2019.  From February 22, 2015 to November 22, 2019, the team achieved a 60 dual meet win streak.

Former wrestlers include Dan Hodge Trophy Winners Kerry McCoy (1997), Zain Retherford (2017, 2018), Bo Nickal (2019), and Olympic Champion David Taylor (2012, 2014).

History
The Penn State wrestling program was established in 1909 and was declared national dual meet champion in 1921.
  In 1925, Penn State won all seven team duals in which they competed, finishing the dual meet season undefeated.

Charlie Spiedel coached the team from 1927-1942 and 1947-1964, taking a four-year break to serve during World War II.  He is credited with laying the groundwork for the Nittany Lion wrestling program's standard of excellence.  He guided the team to the 1953 national title.

Prior to competing in the Big Ten Conference, the Penn State wrestling program competed as members of the Eastern Intercollegiate Wrestling Association (1918-1974) and the Eastern Wrestling League (1975-1992).

Starting lineup 2022-2023

National championships

Team Championships
In 1921, Penn State defeated Indiana, 32-14, and Iowa Agricultural College, 28-18, in post-season dual meets among conference champions.

In addition, Penn State has won eleven NCAA Division I Wrestling Championships as a team.

Individual Championships
The program’s record for most NCAA Champions in one season was set in 2017 and repeated in 2022, with 5 NCAA Champions crowned. In 2017, Zain Retherford (149 lbs), Jason Nolf (157 lbs), Vincenzo Joseph (165 lbs), Mark Hall (174 lbs), and Bo Nickal (184 lbs) and in 2022, Roman Bravo-Young (133 lbs), Nick Lee (141 lbs), Carter Starocci (174 lbs), Aaron Brooks (184 lbs), and Max Dean (197 lbs).

The following table counts the achievements of Nittany Lion wrestlers by name as opposed to year.

Olympics and post-graduate careers

Penn State wrestlers have gone on to have success beyond their NCAA achievements. Wrestlers have had career success in the Olympics and in professional Mixed Martial Arts (MMA).

Coaching

Current coaching staff

Head coach history

Facilities
The Lorenzo Wrestling Complex, widely considered among the best in the nation, gives Penn State athletes a world-class facility for training.  The facility encompasses over 24,000 square feet and includes the practice room, weight room, locker room, and academic support space.  Home dual meets are held in the main gym at Rec Hall and on occasion at the Bryce Jordan Center.

(The Lorenzo Wrestling Complex also serves as the training facility for the Nittany Lion Wrestling Club, a designated U.S. Olympic Regional Training Center.)

Notable Nittany Lion wrestlers

 Sanshiro Abe – represented Japan at 1996 Summer Olympics in freestyle wrestling, NCAA National Champion and four-time All-American
 Roman Bravo-Young – two-time NCAA National Champion
 Aaron Brooks – two-time NCAA National Champion, Cadet World Champion and Junior World silver medalist in freestyle wrestling
 Anthony Cassar – NCAA National Champion
 Ken Chertow – Olympian in freestyle wrestling at 1988 Summer Olympics, three-time NCAA All-American
 Patrick Cummins – former UFC fighter, NCAA runner-up and two-time All-American
 Phil Davis – former UFC fighter and Bellator Light Heavyweight World Champion, NCAA National Champion and four-time All-American
 Mark Hall – 2021 US Open National Champion, one-time Cadet and two-time Junior World Champion in freestyle wrestling, NCAA National Champion and three-time finalist
 Kerry McCoy – two-time Olympian in freestyle wrestling at 2000 and 2004 Summer Olympics, World silver medalist in 2003, two-time NCAA National Champion and three-time All-American
 Frank Molinaro – Olympian at 2016 Summer Olympics in freestyle wrestling, NCAA National Champion, two-time finalist and four-time All-American
 Bo Nickal – UFC fighter, gold medalist at U23 World Wrestling Championships in freestyle wrestling, three-time NCAA National Champion and four-time finalist
 Jason Nolf – gold medalist at 2020 Pan American Wrestling Championships, three-time NCAA National Champion and four-time finalist
 Zain Retherford – two-time US World Team member in freestyle wrestling, Cadet World Champion, three-time NCAA National Champion and four-time All-American
 Ed Ruth – MMA fighter, three-time NCAA National Champion and four-time All-American
 David Taylor – Olympic gold medalist at 2020 Summer Olympics in freestyle wrestling, two-time World Champion, two-time NCAA National Champion and four-time finalist

See also
Iowa-Penn State rivalry
Penn State Wrestling Club
Nittany Lion Wrestling Club

References

External links